The Mobin ( or 'determination') is an Iranian multi-purpose ground-launched unmanned aerial vehicle (UAV). The UAV was first displayed on 27 August 2019 at the MAKS air show held at Zhukovsky International Airport, Russia. The Mobin is the first UAV of its kind in the world, designed to penetrate enemy defenses and get past incoming missiles. The UAV entered service in Iran in 2018 and had been cleared for export.

Capabilities 
The Mobin can function as both an attack and reconnaissance drone and is equipped with radar-evading stealth properties. The UAV has a 3 m wingspan and a low radar cross section of less than 0.1 m2. It has a fuel-management system for short, medium and long ranges.

The navigation system employed by the Mobin is both the TERCOM and DSMAC systems. The guidance of the drone works in three axis with fully automated take off and landing. DSMAC systems are often combined with TERCOM as a terminal guidance system. A TERCOM system considerably increases the accuracy of the guidance compared with inertial navigation systems (INS). The increased accuracy allows a TERCOM-equipped system to fly closer to obstacles and generally at lower altitudes, making it harder to detect by ground radar. 

The Mobin employs the "Toloo-4" turbojet engine. The engine is a single shaft turbojet engine which consists of 3 stage axial compressor, direct annular combustion chamber and 1 stage axial turbine. It weighs 55.9 kg with a diameter of 330mm and length of 1130mm-1330mm. The engine thrust is rated at 345daN with an engine speed of 28500RPM. Its hydro-pneumatic life is rated at 20 hours.

See also 

Armed forces of Iran
Iran Aviation Industries Organization
TERCOM
Unmanned aerial vehicles

References

External links 

 "Terrestrial Guidance Methods", Section 16.5.3 of Fundamentals of Naval Weapons Systems

Unmanned military aircraft of Iran